is the 10th single by Japanese idol girl group NMB48. It was released on November 5, 2014. It debuted in number one on the weekly Oricon Singles Chart. As of December 15, 2014 (issue date), it has sold a total of 449,983 copies. It reached the second place on the Billboard Japan Hot 100. It was the 16th best-selling single of the year in Japan, with 449,983 copies.

Background 
This single will be released in 4 versions: Type A, Type B, Type C and Theater edition. The title song was first performed during NMB48's 4th Anniversary Live on October 14, 2014.

Track list

Type-A

Type-B

Type-C

Theater edition

Members

Rashikunai 
Team N: Yuki Kashiwagi, Yuuka Kato, Riho Kotani, Kei Jonishi, Aika Nishimura, Sayaka Yamamoto, Akari Yoshida
Team M: Miru Shiroma, Momoka Kinoshita, Airi Tanigawa, Reina Fujie, Sae Murase, Fuuko Yagura, Nana Yamada, Rina Kushiro
Team BII: Miori Ichikawa, Ayaka Umeda, Kanako Kadowaki, Nagisa Shibuya, Akane Takayanagi, Shu Yabushita, Miyuki Watanabe

Tomodachi 
Team N: Sayaka Yamamoto
Team M: Nana Yamada

Kyusen Kyotei 
Team N: Yuuri Ota, Yuki Kashiwagi, Yuuka Kato, Rika Kishino, Saki Kono, Narumi Koga, Riho Kotani, Kei Jonishi, Ririka Sutou, Aika Nishimura, Anna Murashige, Kanako Muro, Tsubasa Yamauchi, Natsumi Yamagishi, Yuki Yamaguchi, Sayaka Yamamoto, Akari Yoshida

Migi ni Shiteru Ring 
Team M: Yuki Azuma, Akari Ishizuka, Ayaka Okita, Rena Kawakami, Momoka Kinoshita, Rina Kushiro, Rina Kondo, Miru Shiroma, Yui Takano, Sara Takei, Airi Tanigawa, Reina Fujie, Arisa Miura, Mao Mita, Ayaka Murakami, Sae Murase, Fuuko Yagura, Nana Yamada

Star ni Nante Naritakunai 
Team BII: Anna Ijiri, Kanae Iso, Miori Ichikawa, Mirei Ueda, Ayaka Umeda, Kanako Kadowaki, Emika Kamieda, Chihiro Kawakami, Haruna Kinoshita, Konomi Kusaka, Hazuki Kurokawa, Nagisa Shibuya, Akane Takayanagi, Kokoro Naiki, Momoka Hayashi, Shu Yabushita, Miyuki Watanabe

Asphalt no Namida 
Kenkyuusei: Natsuko Akashi, Yuumi Ishida, Mizuki Uno, Mai Odan, Eriko Jo, Honoka Terui, Reina Nakano, Rurina Nishizawa, Chiho Matsuoka, Megumi Matsumura, Ayaka Morita, Rina Yamao

References 

2014 singles
2014 songs
Japanese-language songs
NMB48 songs
Oricon Weekly number-one singles